The Liberal Democrats are a political party in the United Kingdom.  While in opposition, the Leader of the Liberal Democrats appoints a frontbench team of Members of Parliament (MPs), Peers, Members of the Scottish Parliament (MSPs) and Members of the Senedd (MSs), to speak for the party on different issues. Their areas of responsibility broadly corresponded to those of Government ministers. The frontbench team is divided into departmental sub-units, the principal ones being the economy, foreign policy, and home affairs. Sometimes the frontbench team consists of more than just the principal positions.

Status
Formerly, the Liberal Democrats frontbench team did not use the term 'Shadow Cabinet', with a number of frontbench spokespeople covering areas (e.g., Defence and Foreign Affairs) rather than directly shadowing specific Cabinet portfolios. Under Charles Kennedy's leadership, and with the increase in numbers of Liberal Democrat MPs after the 1997 general election, the senior members of the frontbench team began referring to themselves as a Shadow Cabinet. This was controversial, because in the two-party political system that dominated UK politics in the 20th century, the term 'Shadow Cabinet' referred to senior members of the frontbench team of the largest single opposition party in the House of Commons. This party, known as the Official Opposition, has constitutional status, although its Shadow Cabinet does not. Following Kennedy's decision to change the nomenclature, the UK Parliament's website used for a time the term 'Liberal Democrat Shadow Cabinet' in place of the old term 'Frontbench Team'.

This is not without contention, and was disputed by the Conservative Party, who were then the Official Opposition. However, the official listing at the Parliament website is explicit in using the term 'Shadow Cabinet'. In 2001, Chancellor of the Exchequer Gordon Brown said the following in the House of Commons:

Brown returned to this theme, comparing his frosty relationship with the official Shadow Chancellor George Osborne with his apparently warm relationship with Vince Cable (whom he referred to as "the Shadow Chancellor from Twickenham").

The Official Opposition receives support for its official function which is denied to smaller opposition parties, although they, along with every parliamentary party, do receive Short Money. While the Opposition Leader and Chief Whips draw salaries, their counterparts in smaller opposition parties do not. The Official Opposition also has the exclusive use of facilities within Parliament.

Following the 2010 general election and the confirmation of Conservative leader David Cameron as Prime Minister on 11 May 2010, a coalition cabinet was formed that included Liberal Democrat ministers, including Liberal leader Nick Clegg as Deputy Prime Minister and Lord President of the Council. Thus, the Liberal Democrats entered the Cabinet again for the first time since the 1940s.

Following the 2015 general election, the Liberal Democrats were reduced to just eight seats in the House of Commons, falling into joint fourth place with the Democratic Unionist Party behind the Scottish National Party (SNP) for the first time. As a result of this, Parliament's website listed the SNP's frontbench team (in comparison with the Conservative Cabinet and Labour Shadow Cabinet) in lieu of the Liberal Democrat frontbench team.

Previous frontbench teams

Previous team key-members in summary:

See also
 Cabinet of the United Kingdom
 Official Opposition Shadow Cabinet (United Kingdom)
 List of British shadow cabinets

References

External links
 The Liberal Democrats – Frontbench team
 UK Parliament – Liberal Democrat Shadow Cabinet

Politics of the United Kingdom